Attorney General Morrison may refer to:

Donald Morison (1857–1924), Attorney General of Newfoundland
Howard Morrison (barrister) (born 1949), Attorney General of Anguilla
Paul J. Morrison (born 1954), Attorney General of Kansas
Robert Morrison (politician) (1909–1999), Attorney General of Arizona